The WWRU National Cup is the top national competition for women's rugby union football clubs in Wales.

External links
 Official site

Women's rugby union competitions
Rugby union competitions in Wales
Women's rugby union in Wales
Wales